Amapala is a municipality in the Honduran department of Valle.

It is formed by El Tigre Island and its satellite islets and rocks in the Gulf of Fonseca. Thanks to a natural deep channel, and despite lacking modern infrastructure, Amapala long served as the main Honduran port in the Pacific Ocean.

History

The name of the island on which Amapala is based is due to the fact that in the 16th century a group of pirates operated by the pirate Francis Drake operated on the island, he and his men were considered by the inhabitants of the area as wild and bloody beasts , so they called the island "Cerro de El Tigre". The name Amapala derives from Nahuatl and means "close to amates."   However, there is another theory that states that it comes from the words "ama" (corn) and "palha" (hill) of the Goajiquiro dialect, and therefore would mean "hill of corn".

Amapala was founded in 1838, and its port was opened and declared free in 1868. During the 19th century it exported large quantities of gold, silver and other ores, although its progress was retarded by the delay in constructing a transcontinental railway from Puerto Cortés. 
By the mid 1970s, Amapala was gradually replaced in importance by the port of San Lorenzo on the mainland.

A description of the town in 1881 can be found in the book A Lady's Ride Across Spanish Honduras by Mary Lester (a.k.a. Mary Soltera). It was intended to be the capital of the Republic of Central America in the late 1890s.

Demographics
At the time of the 2013 Honduras census, Amapala municipality had a population of 12,250. Of these, 74.16% were Mestizo, 22.81% White, 1.55% Black or Afro-Honduran, 0.09% Indigenous and 1.39% others.

Climate
This area  typically has a pronounced dry season.  According to the Köppen climate classification system, Amapala has a tropical savanna climate, abbreviated "Aw" on climate maps.

Economy
The community receives funds from former residents who have moved to other countries.  most residents work as fishermen, while 300 have formal jobs.

Gallery

References

Municipalities of the Valle Department